La Digue and Inner Islands is one of the 26 districts of Seychelles. It consists of the island of La Digue and assorted smaller islands of the Inner Islands.

Geography
The population density is 83.8 inhabitants / km2.
It is located in the Inner Islands. Most of the islands of the district belong to the Granitic Seychelles.

Administration

The district was created in 1994 when the government united former La Digue District and Silhouette District.
It is managed by a district administrator, which is seated in the main village of La Passe.

Since 1994 the district has a "Local Government" which is a unit from the Ministry of Local Government, Youth and Sports. The unit's role is to promote the availability of public services at the local level.
The district's motto is: "Avancons lentement mais surement"  (Advance slowly but surely).

Table of Islands

References

External links

Map of Seychelles Districts

 
Districts of Seychelles